Hoseynabad (also Romanized as Ḩoseynābād) is a village in Jorjafak Rural District, in the Central District of Zarand County, Kerman Province, Iran. At the 2006 census, its population was 76, in 24 families.

References 

Populated places in Zarand County